Marion Sarraut (13 August 1938 – 12 July 2021) was a French film and theatre director.

Biography
Born in Saigon in French Indochina, Marion was the granddaughter of former Prime Minister Albert Sarraut. In the 1980s, she directed numerous telefilms.

She was administrator of the Fondation Ostad Elahi, directing a film on the life and works of Nur Ali Elahi.

Marion Sarraut died on 12 July 2021 at the age of 82.

Distinctions
Knight of the Ordre des Arts et des Lettres (1987)
Knight of the Legion of Honour (2002)

Filmography

Actress
Shoot the Piano Player (1960)
A Woman Is a Woman (1961)
Le Signe du Lion (1962)

Director
Le Bel Indifférent (1978)
 (1980)
 (1981)
Areu=MC2 (1982)
 (1983)
 (1985)
Catherine (1986)
 (1987)
 (1989)
 (1991)
Riviera (1991)
Tout feu tout flamme (1994)
 (1994)
Julie Lescaut (1995)
Mourir d'amour (1995)
 (1995, 1997)
 (1996)
 (1996–2003)
 (1997)
 (1998)
 (1999)
Toutes les femmes sont des déesses (2000)
 (2000)
 (2000)
 (2001)
 (2001)
 (2001)
 (2002–2004)
 (2004–2005)
 (2005)
 (2006–2007)
 (2009)
Le Premier été (2014)
 (2015)
La Sainte famille (2017)

References

1938 births
2021 deaths
People from Ho Chi Minh City
French film directors
French theatre directors
French women film directors
Women theatre directors
Chevaliers of the Ordre des Arts et des Lettres
Chevaliers of the Légion d'honneur